Stephen Antunes Eustáquio (born 21 December 1996) is a Canadian professional soccer player who plays as a midfielder for Primeira Liga club Porto and the Canada national team.

After starting out at Nazarenos, he has spent most of his club career in Portugal with Torreense, Leixões, Chaves, Paços de Ferreira and Porto. He also played briefly in Mexico with Cruz Azul.

Born in Canada, Eustáquio represented Portugal at youth level. However, in 2019 he committed to play for Canada and debuted for them in November of that year. He was part of their squad that reached the semi-finals of the 2021 CONCACAF Gold Cup, also being selected for the 2022 World Cup.

Club career

Early career
Born in Leamington, Ontario to Portuguese parents, Eustáquio first played soccer with Leamington Minor Soccer, moving to Portugal at age 7. After beginning with amateurs Nazarenos, he spent two seasons in the third division with Torreense.

Leixões
On 7 June 2017, Eustáquio signed with Leixões for an undisclosed fee. On 23 July he appeared in his first match as a professional in a 2–0 home win against Académico de Viseu in the first round of the Taça da Liga where he played the full 90 minutes, and his debut in the Segunda Liga was on 6 August in a 4–1 away loss to Real Massamá.

Chaves
Eustáquio joined Chaves on 31 January 2018, on a five-and-a-half-year deal after his buyout clause of €500,000 was paid. He made his Primeira Liga debut four days later, playing the entire 2–1 away victory over Feirense; he scored his first top-flight goal on 14 April, helping his team to come from behind to draw 3–3 at Boavista.

On 14 September 2018, in a Portuguese League Cup match at the Estádio do Dragão, Eustáquio scored a late equalizer which helped Chaves draw 1–1 and record their first ever point at Porto's home ground.

Cruz Azul
Eustáquio moved to Cruz Azul of the Mexican Liga MX on 15 January 2019. Vítor Severino, who worked as assistant to manager Luís Castro at Chaves, described him as "like the typical player from La Masia, from Barcelona". On his debut, against Tijuana, he was sent off mere minutes after taking the field as a substitute, but eventually the video assistant referee cautioned him with only a yellow card upon review; shortly after, however, he was stretchered off with an injury.

After being sidelined for eight months, Eustáquio returned to the pitch on 22 September 2019, playing for the under-20 team in preparation for his full return.

Paços de Ferreira
In December 2019, Eustáquio was loaned to Portuguese top-flight club Paços de Ferreira for the remainder of the season. He made his league debut on 11 January 2020, in a 0–0 away draw against Portimonense.

Eustáquio agreed to another loan in September 2020. The following January, the move was made permanent for a fee of €2.5 million. He scored his first goal for them on 24 October, closing the 1–1 league draw at Nacional, and six days later he added another in a 3–2 win over Porto at the Estádio da Mata Real.

On 10 April 2021, Eustáquio lasted only 22 minutes in a 5–0 home loss to Benfica, receiving a straight red card for a foul on Julian Weigl. He made his European debut on 5 August, and netted the third in the 4–0 home victory against Larne in the third qualifying round of the UEFA Europa Conference League.

Porto
In January 2022, Eustáquio was loaned to Porto for the rest of the season, with an option to buy. He played his first match on 6 February, replacing Fábio Vieira late into a 2–0 away defeat of Arouca.

On 31 May 2022, Porto exercised its purchase option, signing Eustáquio to a contract until 30 June 2027. Having become a starter for the Sérgio Conceição-led side, he scored his first goal on 30 September in the 4–1 home win over Braga. He added two more in the group stage of the UEFA Champions League to help his team to progress as group winners, at Club Brugge in a 4–0 victory and against Atlético Madrid in a 2–1 home win.

In Porto's run to winning the 2022–23 Taça da Liga, Eustáquio scored early opening goals in the 3–0 semi-final victory over Académico de Viseu and the 2–0 final against Sporting CP.

International career

Youth
Eligible to represent Canada and Portugal, Eustáquio appeared for Canada's under-17 side at the 2012 AGS Cup.

In November 2017, Portugal under-21 manager Rui Jorge selected him for 2019 UEFA European Championship qualifiers against Romania and Switzerland to be held early in that month. He won his first cap against the former, playing 90 minutes and being booked in the 1–1 draw in Constanța.

Senior
In February 2019, Eustáquio committed to play for Canada at senior level. Upon his return from his knee injury, he received his first call-up to the team on 1 October 2019 for a CONCACAF Nations League fixture against the United States. He made his debut on 15 November, coming from the bench for Mark-Anthony Kaye in the second half of the 4–1 away defeat.

Eustáquio was named to a 60-man preliminary squad for the 2021 CONCACAF Gold Cup on 18 June, before being included in the final squad for the tournament. He scored his first international goal in the first group fixture on 11 July, a 4–1 win over Martinique in Kansas City, and added a direct free kick four days later to open a 4–1 defeat of Haiti at the same venue. Canada made the semi-finals, with him concluding the 2–0 victory against Costa Rica in the last eight.

Eustáquio was called-up to the 2022 FIFA World Cup squad, playing two games in a group-stage elimination.

Personal life
Eustáquio's older brother, Mauro, is also a former professional soccer player. He represented Canada at under-20 and under-23 levels.

Career statistics

Club

International

Scores and results list Canada's goal tally first, score column indicates score after each Eustáquio goal.

Honours
Porto
Primeira Liga: 2021–22
Taça de Portugal: 2021–22
Taça da Liga: 2022–23
Supertaça Cândido de Oliveira: 2022

Individual
Primeira Liga Midfielder of the Month: September 2022

References

External links

1996 births
Living people
People from Leamington, Ontario
People from Nazaré, Portugal
Canadian people of Portuguese descent
Sportspeople from Leiria District
Portuguese footballers
Canadian soccer players
Soccer people from Ontario
Association football midfielders
Primeira Liga players
Liga Portugal 2 players
Campeonato de Portugal (league) players
S.C.U. Torreense players
Leixões S.C. players
G.D. Chaves players
F.C. Paços de Ferreira players
FC Porto players
Liga MX players
Cruz Azul footballers
Portugal under-21 international footballers
Canada men's international soccer players
2021 CONCACAF Gold Cup players
2022 FIFA World Cup players
Portuguese expatriate footballers
Canadian expatriate soccer players
Expatriate footballers in Mexico
Portuguese expatriate sportspeople in Mexico
Canadian expatriate sportspeople in Mexico